The University of Colorado School of Dental Medicine is the dental school of the University of Colorado. It is located on the Anschutz Medical Campus of the University of Colorado Denver in the city of Aurora, Colorado, United States. It is the only dental school in Colorado.

History 
The School of Dental Medicine is part of the University of Colorado. This school was established in 1973 by an amendment to the state constitution and is the only dental school in Colorado. Previously, the Denver School of Dentistry been established in the state, operating as a unit of the University of Denver between 1888 and 1932.

Academics 
University of Colorado Denver School of Dental Medicine awards the following degrees:
Doctor of Dental Surgery
General Practice Residency
Graduate program - orthodontics
Graduate program - periodontics

Departments 
University of Colorado Denver School of Dental Medicine includes the following departments:
Department of Applied Dentistry
Department of Craniofacial Biology
Department of Diagnostic and Biological Sciences

Accreditation 
University of Colorado Denver School of Dental Medicine is currently accredited by ADA.

Notable alumni
 Archie B. Brusse
 Jeffrey S. Holt

See also

American Student Dental Association

References 

Educational institutions established in 1922
University of Colorado Denver School of Dental Medicine
Dental schools in Colorado
1922 establishments in Colorado